Sheeno Berridge (born 27 September 1990) is a West Indian cricketer. He made his first-class debut for the Leeward Islands in the 2017–18 Regional Four Day Competition on 16 November 2017. He made his List A debut for the Leeward Islands in the 2017–18 Regional Super50 on 31 January 2018.

References

External links
 

Living people
Leeward Islands cricketers
Place of birth missing (living people)
1990 births
Kittitian cricketers